Bethel is a former community in Clay County, Illinois, United States. Bethel was located in Songer Township, along a railroad line north of Greendale.

References

Populated places in Clay County, Illinois
Ghost towns in Illinois